Pantheon is an American adult animated science fiction drama television series created by Craig Silverstein. The series is based on a series of short stories by Ken Liu. The series premiered on September 1, 2022 on AMC+. In January 2023, the series was canceled after one season, despite a two-season order. It was also removed from AMC+ and HIDIVE.

Premise
In 2001, genius visionary Stephen Holstrom and founder of Logorhythms, a technological corporation, speaks about his mission to reach digital immortality with the advancement "Uploaded Intelligence" or "UI," - scanning the human brain and uploading it on the Cloud. Years later, after Holstrom's death, Logorythms continues his project, using various illegal and unethical means to reach their goals.

Shaken by the death of her beloved father two years prior, Maddie Kim is a bullied teen who receives mysterious help from someone online, who is soon thereafter revealed to be her deceased father, David. David explains that his consciousness has been successfully uploaded to Logorhythms' cloud following an experimental and destructive brain scan, and that Logorythms lied to his family about the results. Wanting to save her father, Maddie seeks help from others and eventually gains custody of her father's U.I., but the family is still facing danger from Logorythms.

At the same time, Caspian, a troubled yet highly intelligent teenage boy is embroiled in his own intrigue involving Logorythms. Since birth, Caspian's life has been a lie, raised unaware that he is in a constructed environment and constantly monitored by Logorythms, to one day fulfill a specific purpose. Through a chatroom, Caspian comes into contact with Maddie and the two aid each other in searching for the truth, which also helps Caspian gradually learn the truth about his reality.  

Chanda, an engineer from the India-based Alliance Telecom company, wishes to use U.I. technology to usher in a digital utopia. After meeting with a rival company, Chanda's corrupt boss has him kidnapped and reveals that Alliance Telecom has secretly been conducting U.I. experiments, and Chanda himself is scanned, resulting in his death in the real world with his U.I. uploaded to perform menial tasks within Alliance's systems. With help from previous U.I. victims, Chanda escapes his virtual prison and becomes a rogue wildcard.

With Maddie and Caspian stuck in the middle, a global conspiracy unfolds that threatens to trigger a new kind of world war.

Cast and characters

Main
 Katie Chang as Maddie Kim, a 14-year-old withdrawn, shy, and strong-willed high school girl. Maddie has an affinity for technology and was taught computer programming by her father. Smart and determined, Maddie displays a lot of bravery as she gets entangled in a large conspiracy.
 Paul Dano as Caspian, a 17-year-old sullen yet kind teenager. A computer science genius, Caspian has unknowingly been raised as special Logorhythms operation for the purpose of being the "key" to Holstrom's U.I legacy. 
 Daniel Dae Kim as David Kim, Maddie's loving, altruistic father and a programming genius. Afflicted with a terminal illness at age 43, David agreed to Logorhythms's U.I. procedure to preserve his mind. With help from his family and Laurie, he was able to escape Logorhythms.
 Rosemarie DeWitt as Ellen Kim, Maddie's protective and down-to-earth mother, and a college history professor
 Aaron Eckhart as Cary, Caspian's father and a secret agent of Logorhythms, having worked closely with Holstrom before his death. While he plays the role of an abusive husband, Cary genuinely cares for the boy and wants to protect him. 
 Chris Diamantopoulos as Pope, current CEO of Logorhythms, who is seeking to realize the dreams of his best friend, Holstrom
 Raza Jaffrey as Chanda, a brilliant and humble engineer from Alliance Telecom who has interest in U.I. After being killed and forcefully uploaded as an U.I. by Prasad, Chanda was able to escape his cage and become the third rogue U.I.
 Ron Livingston as Waxman, a Logorhythms employee and part of the Julius's inner circle. An old friend to David Kim, he was the one who recruited David to help them with their U.I. research.
 Taylor Schilling as Renee, Caspian's mother, a secret agent of Logorhythms, and Holstrom's former lover. While she acts as a timid and caring mother, Renee coldly sees her son as an assignment.

Co-starring
 Heather Lind as Laurie, a former 31-year-old investment manager on Wall Street. After a car crash three years prior left her in critical condition, she underwent Logorhythms's U.I. procedure and was then used for her marketing talent. Laurie is the first successful U.I. and became allies with Maddie and her family.
 Scoot McNairy as Cody, an artist and Laurie's husband. Despite previously being lied to by Logorhythms that Laurie's I.U. procedure was a failure, Cody eventually reunites with his wife and they work together with the Kim family.
 Krystina Alabado as Hannah, Nicole
 Kevin Durand as Anssi, Chauffuer, Manager, Arkady Koslov
 Grey Griffin as Erin, Ms. Hunter, Assistant, Samara, Zhong
 Michael Kelly as CEO, Carl Van Leuwen, Air Force Officer, Angry Man
 Anika Noni Rose as Nicole, Side-Pony, Facility Manager, Ballet Teacher, News Anchor, Nurse, Joey
 Samuel Roukin as Gabe, Ellen's kind and gentle co-worker who became her boyfriend after David's death
 Odeya Rush as Samara, a popular girl at Berkshire Academy and the ringleader of Maddie's bullies.
 William Hurt as Stephen Holstrom, the deceased founder of Logorhythms and a legendary genius billionaire. Although he died before perfecting uploaded intelligence, his loyal followers carry on his work.
 Maude Apatow as Justine, a blunt and somewhat apathetic student at Berkshire Academy that Maddie befriends
 Nyima Funk as Deirdre Ryan, an Logorhythms employee and part of the Julius's inner circle
 Ajay Mehta as Prasad, the corrupted CEO of Alliance Telecom, a rival company to Logorhythms, and Chanda's boss
 Madhur Jaffrey as Preethi, Chanda's mother
 Tunde Adebimpe as Stephan Gold, a member of the U.S government
 Clyde Kusatsu as Ping, a Chinese former criminal and U.I.
 Ken Leung as Bai Fu, a Chinese former criminal and U.I.
 Vincent Ventresca, as Brother Kenneth, Tech
 Corey Stoll as Jake, News Anchor
 Laura Meakin as Alon Aboutboul
 SungWon Cho as Teacher
 Julian Lerner as Oliver
 Magnus Mclain as Brandon
 Annabella Sciorra as News Anchor, Government Official 
 Lara Pulver as News Anchor
 Quinn Hawking as Lieutenant, News Anchor
 Jacob Sartorius as Bored Boy
 Suraj Sharma as IT Officer

Episodes

Production

Development
On August 3, 2018, it was reported that AMC opened a writers room for the animated drama Pantheon. On March 10, 2020, AMC had given the production a 2-season series order consisting eight episodes each. Pantheon is AMC's first hour-long animated drama original series. The series is created by Craig Silverstein who also executive produced the series. AMC Studios and Titmouse, Inc. are involved with producing the series. The series is based on Ken Liu's short stories "The Gods Will Not Be Chained", "The Gods Will Not Be Slain", "The Gods Have Not Died in Vain", "Staying Behind" and "Altogether Elsewhere, Vast Herds of Reindeer" from the short fictions collection The Hidden Girl and Other Stories.

A second season was in production by August 2022. On January 8, 2023, AMC canceled the series after one season, despite a two-season order. It was also removed from the AMC's streaming service and HIDIVE.

Casting
On July 23, 2020, Taylor Schilling, Rosemarie DeWitt, Aaron Eckhart, and Paul Dano were cast in starring roles. On August 7, 2020, Daniel Dae Kim, Katie Chang, Ron Livingston, Chris Diamantopoulos, Raza Jaffrey, Scoot McNairy, Anika Noni Rose, Grey Griffin, SungWon Cho, Kevin Durand, Samuel Roukin, and Krystina Alabado joined the cast in starring roles. On February 18, 2021, William Hurt, Maude Apatow, Corey Stoll, and Lara Pulver were cast in starring roles.

Release
The series premiered on September 1, 2022 on AMC+ and HIDIVE. The first episode was available for all viewers on HIDIVE and on AMC+ official YouTube.

Reception
On review aggregator website Rotten Tomatoes, the series holds a 100% approval rating based on 15 critic reviews, with an average rating of 8.2/10. The website's critics consensus reads, "A sophisticated treatise on consciousness and mortality, this absorbing mind-bender earns its own place in the pantheon of exemplary animated television." Metacritic, which uses a weighted average, assigned a score of 77 out of 100 based on 8 critics, indicating "generally favorable reviews".

References

External links
Pantheon AMC Studios
 

2020s American adult animated television series
2020s American drama television series
2020s American science fiction television series
2022 American television series debuts
2022 American television series endings
AMC (TV channel) original programming
American adult animated drama television series
American adult animated science fiction television series
Animated thriller television series
Anime-influenced Western animated television series
English-language television shows
Television series based on short fiction